This is a list of famous or notable Zambians, or people of Zambian descent, or people who have influenced Zambia listed in the following categories, and in no particular order:

Businesspeople 
 Geoffrey Bwalya Mwamba
 Hakainde Hichilema
 Rajan Mahtani
 Sylvia Masebo
 Clever Mpoha
 Susan Mulikita
Peter Sakala

Politics

Politicians

Presidents 
 Kenneth David Kaunda – President – 1964–1991
 Frederick Titus Jacob Chiluba – President – 1991–2001
 Levy Patrick Mwanawasa – President – 2001–2008
 Rupiah Bwezani Banda – President – 2008–2011
 Michael Chilufya Sata – President – 2011–2014
 Dr. Guy Scott – Acting President – October 2014 – January 2015
 Edgar Lungu – President – 2015–2021
 Hakainde Hichilema – President – 2021 – Current

Vice presidents 
 Reuben Chitandika Kamanga – Vice President – 1964–1967
 Simon Kapwepwe – Vice President – 1967–1970
 Mainza Mathias Chona – Vice President – 1970–1973 (post abolished thereafter and reintroduced in 1991)
 Levy Patrick Mwanawasa – Vice President – 1991–1994
 Godfrey Miyanda – Vice President – 1994–1997
 Christon Tembo – Vice President – 1997–2001
 Enoch P. Kavindele – Vice President – 2001–2003
 Nevers Mumba – Vice President – 2003–2004
 Lupando Katoloshi Mwape – Vice President – 2004–2006
 Rupiah Bwezani Banda – Vice President – 2006–2008
 George Kunda – Vice President – 2008–2011
 Dr. Guy Scott – Vice President – 2011–2014
 Inonge Wina – Vice President – 2015–2021
 Mutale Nalumango – Vice President – 2021–Current

Prime ministers 
 Mainza Chona – Prime Minister, 1973–1975, 1977–1978
 Elijah Mudenda – Prime Minister, 1975–1977
 Daniel Lisulo – Prime Minister, 1978–1981
 Nalumino Mundia – Prime Minister, 1981–1985
 Kebby Musokotwane – Prime Minister, 1985–1989, Secretary-General, UNIP 1989–1991, Opposition President, 1992
 Malimba Masheke – Prime Minister, 1989–1991 (post abolished thereafter)

Others 
 Akashambatwa Mbikusita-Lewanika – former minister/democratic campaigner
 Anderson Mazoka – former opposition leader (1998–2006)
 Austin Liato – former minister/labour leader, former Pan-African Parliament MP
 Besnat Jere – former Pan-African Parliament MP
 Crispin Shumina – former MP, former Pan-African Parliament MP
 Dickson Jere – former Special Assistant to the President for Press and Public Relations, under Rupiah Banda
 Edward Makuka Nkoloso – former director of Zambia National Academy of Science, Space Research and Philosophy
 Elias Chipimo Jnr – retired opposition leader
 Gladys Nyirongo – former Lands Minister
 Hakainde Hichilema – opposition leader (2006–2021 (Became president))
 Inonge Mbikusita-Lewanika – diplomat, former UNICEF Regional Adviser for Africa, Presidential Candidate (2001)
 Kabinga Pande – former Foreign Affairs Minister
 Kalombo Mwansa – former Foreign Affairs Minister
 Luke Mwananshiku – former Finance Minister
 M. K. Mubanga – former Pan-African Parliament MP
 Mundia Sikatana – former Justice Minister
 Ompie Nkumbula-Lieventhal – former MP, former Pan-African Parliament MP
 Peter Daka – Minister of science and technology, former Pan-African Parliament MP
 Ronnie Shikapwasha – former Information Minister
 Susan Nakazwe – former Mayor of Lusaka
Patrick Anthony Mwewa Chikusu – Deputy Minister of Health in the Republic of Zambia
Thokozile Muwamba – first female fighter pilot
Besa Mumba – youngest female commercial pilot
Daniel Collins Mwamba – engineer, writer and science enthusiast

Traditional rulers 
Chieftainships are listed here. These articles cover all holders of the traditional titles; prominent individual holders may also have their own articles, usually in People in the History of Zambia below.

Other notable traditional leaders include:
Chitimukulu
Mwata Kazembe
Chief Kanongesha
Chief Monze
Litunga
Paramount Chief Mpezeni
Chief Mporokoso

Religious figures 
 Emmanuel Milingo – Christian leader, has established the 'Married Priests Now' organisation in the USA
 Adrian Mung'andu – Catholic archbishop of Lusaka

Sports

Footballers

Athletes

Boxers

Other sports 
Corné Krige
Ellis Chibuye
Felix Bwalya
George Gregan
Madalitso Muthiya
Obed Mutanya
PG Nana
Samuel Matete
Yunus Badat
Amon Simutowe

Artists 
 Henry Tayali
 David Fairbairn
Agnes Yombwe  
Milumbe Haimbe  
Mulenga Mulenga
Paul Ngozi

Authors 
 Dambisa Moyo
 Field Ruwe
 Binwell Sinyangwe
 Wilbur Smith
 Ellen Banda-Aaku
 Jack Avon
 Namwali Serpell
 Fwanyanga Mulikita
 Kenneth Kaunda

Chess players 
 Amon Simutowe

Zambian lawyers 
 Likando Kalaluka - Attorney General of the republic of Zambia from 2015 to 2021
 Chipokota Mwanawasa - Special Assistant to the Zambian President for Public Policy from 2021 to date.
 Nelly Mutti
 Bokani Soko - Prominent business and lawyer

Media and TV 
 Jonah Buyoya - Zambian Journalist

Physicians 
 Aaron Mujajati
Emmanuel Wiza Sichinga

Other people born in/related to Zambia 
 Steve Arneil – Karate Kyokushin practitioner born in South Africa, but lived in Zambia 
 Joseph and Luka Banda – Conjoined twins
 Lukwesa Burak – Sky News anchor based in London
 Norman Carr – British wildlife conservationist who set up national parks in Zambia
 John Edmond – Zambian-born Rhodesian singer
 Phil Edmonds – English cricketer born in Lusaka
 Robert Earnshaw – Zambian-born Welsh international football player
 Stanley Fischer – Zambian-born Deputy Chairman of the U.S. Federal Reserve Bank and Governor of the Bank of Israel
 Tawny Gray – sculptor
 George Gregan – Zambian-born captain of the Australian Wallabies Rugby Union team
 Amy Holmes – Zambian-born (Zambian father, American mother), The Blaze news anchor and CNN political contributor
 Daffyd James – Zambian-born Welsh international rugby player
 V. M. Jones – Author
 Corné Krige – Zambian-born South African Springboks Rugby Union team player
 Robert Lange – Zambian-born record producer and songwriter
 Chilu Lemba – Radio and TV presenter
 Rozalla Miller – British/Zimbabwean singer born to a Zambian mother
 Dambisa Moyo – International economist and best-selling author, born and raised in Lusaka
 Martin Mubanga – Zambian extrajudicial prisoner of the United States
 Monica Musonda – Lawyer turned entrepreneur
 Rungano Nyoni – Zambian-born Welsh director
 Nsofwa Petronella Sampa – Psychological counselor and HIV activist
 Emeli Sandé – British singer, Zambian father
 Denise Scott Brown – Zambian-born American architect
 David Shepherd – British conservationist who has painted Zambian wildlife
 Kapelwa Sikota (1928–2006) – First Zambian registered nurse
 Hammerskjoeld Simwinga – Conservationist/environmentalist
 Peter Amos Siwo – Pioneering graduate and civil servant
 Wilbur Smith – Zambian-born British/South African author
 Jeff Whitley – Zambian-born footballer

Other prominent figures in the history of Zambia 
This is a list of deceased historical figures (or sub-lists of them) in Zambia and its antecedent territories, and combines Zambians, Africans and non-Zambians including British people and Northern Rhodesians.

 Robert Edward Codrington – colonial administrator of the two territories ruled by the British South Africa Company (BSAC) which later became Zambia
 Father Jean-Jacques Corbeil – Canadian missionary and ethnographer of Bemba culture
 Dan Crawford – missionary pioneer
 Bishop Joseph Dupont – missionary pioneer
 Sir Stewart Gore-Browne – called Chipembele by Africans, soldier, pioneer white settler, builder, politician and supporter of independence in Northern Rhodesia
 List of Governors of Northern Rhodesia
 List of Governors-General of the Federation of Rhodesia and Nyasaland
 Evelyn Dennison Hone – last governor of Northern Rhodesia
 Alice Lenshina – leader of the Lumpa religious sect
 General Paul von Lettow-Vorbeck – leader of German East Africa forces of World War I
 Lewanika – Litunga of the Lozi
 David Livingstone – British Scottish missionary-explorer
 Michael Mataka – first native Zambian to become police commissioner
 Mwata Kazembe – Chief of the Kazembe-Lunda
 Mpezeni – warrior-king of one of the largest Ngoni groups of central Africa
 Nalumino Mundia – Prime Minister, 1981–1985
 Alick Nkhata – popular Zambian musician and broadcaster in the 1950s through to the mid-1970s
 Baldwin Nkumbula
 Harry Nkumbula – Nationalist leader who assisted in the struggle for the independence of Northern Rhodesia from British colonialism
 Mwene Chitengi Chiyengele – Mbunda chief who led his tribesmen from north-eastern Angola to Bulozi, western Zambia around 1795.
 Cecil Rhodes – English-born businessman, mining magnate, and politician in South Africa and  an ardent believer in colonialism and imperialism, founder of the state of Rhodesia
 Sebetwane – Basotho chief who fled from Shaka Zulu, eventually conquering and settling in Western Province
 Mamochisane – daughter of Sebetwane, succeeded him as Makololo queen
 Sekeletu – Makololo King of Barotseland in western Zambia from about 1851 to his death in 1863
 Alfred Sharpe – British administrator and agent for Cecil Rhodes
 Lawrence Aubrey Wallace
 Roy Welensky – leader of white trade union and settler politician

See also 
 History of Zambia
 List of Zambia-related topics
 List of Mbunda Chiefs in Zambia

References